Solo Anthology: The Best of Lindsey Buckingham is a compilation album released by American musician and former Fleetwood Mac vocalist-guitarist Lindsey Buckingham, released on October 5, 2018. The album draws from all six of Buckingham's studio records, spanning from 1981's Law and Order to 2011's Seeds We Sow. "Hunger" and "Ride This Road" were previously unreleased songs recorded in 2012. The most recent addition of the set is "Sleeping Around the Corner", from the 2017 duet album Lindsey Buckingham Christine McVie. Alternate editions of the set include an abridged single-disc version and a deluxe six-LP deluxe vinyl set.

One reviewer praised the contrast between some of Buckingham's more unusual material alongside some of his more commercial cuts potentially suitable for Fleetwood Mac, such as "Love Runs Deeper" and "You Do or You Don't". The unbalanced representation of Buckingham's solo records is criticized, noting that Out of the Cradle boasts eight tracks, while Law and Order has just one featured on the compilation.

Track listing
All tracks written by Lindsey Buckingham, except where noted.

Personnel
Main artist
 Lindsey Buckingham – guitars, bass, keyboards, percussion, drums, programming, lap harp, vocals
Additional musicians
 Drums: Mick Fleetwood, Walfredo Reyes Jr., Michael Huey, Taku Hirano
 Bass: George Hawkins, Bryant Simpson, John McVie, Larry Klein, Buell Neidlinger, Brett Tuggle
 Keyboards: Mitchell Froom, Gordon Fordyce, Brett Tuggle, Lindsay Vannoy
 Percussion: Alex Acuña, Mick Fleetwood, Gordon Fordyce, Walfredo Reyes, Taku Hirano
 Rhythm guitars: Neale Heywood, Brett Tuggle (Disc 3)
 Backing vocals: Neale Heywood, Brett Tuggle
Production
 Producers: Lindsey Buckingham, Richard Dashut, Gordon Fordyce, Rob Cavallo, Mitchell Froom
 Composers: Lindsey Buckingham, Kristen Buckingham, Richard Dashut, Cordelia Sipper, Gordon Fordyce, Lisa Dewey
 Art direction: Rory Wilson
 Design: Rory Wilson
 Photography: Lindsey Buckingham, Kristen Buckingham, Richard Dashut, Deyo Glines, Scott Gruber, Sahil Mehta, John Russo, Kelly Sikkema, Rory Wilson
 Remastering: Stephen Marcussen
 Compilation: Lindsey Buckingham
 Project supervisors: Bill Inglot, Jason Day
 Project assistants: Susanne Savage, John Srebalus, Shannon Ward, Steve Wollard, Sheryl Farber
 Product manager: Liuba Shapiro
 Discographical annotation: Patrick Milligan

Charts

References

2018 greatest hits albums
Lindsey Buckingham albums
Rhino Records compilation albums